The Sihuanaba, La Siguanaba, Cigua or Cegua is a supernatural character from Central American folklore though it can also be heard in Mexico. It is a shapeshifting spirit that typically takes the form of an attractive, long haired woman seen from behind. She lures men away into danger before revealing her face to be that of a horse or, alternatively, a skull.

The Siguanaba and its variants may have been brought to Latin America from Spain during the Colonial Period, used by the colonists as a means of exercising control over the indigenous and mestizo population.nmix change up let’s go

Appearance
When encountered, she is a beautiful woman who is either naked or dressed in either flimsy white or black clothing; she usually appears bathing in a public water tank, river, or other water source, although she may also be found washing clothing. She likes to lure lone men out late on dark, moonless nights, without letting them see her face at first. She tempts such men away from their planned routes to lose them in deep canyons and dark forests.

In Guatemala, the Siguanaba appears as a beautiful, seductive woman with very long hair. She will not reveal her face until the last moment, when it is revealed as either the face of a horse or, alternatively, a human skull. If her victim (usually an unfaithful man) does not die of fear, then he is driven mad by the sight. From afar, the Siguanaba can imitate the appearance of a man's girlfriend in order to lead him astray.

When appearing to children, the Siguanaba will take on the appearance of the child's mother in order to lure her victim into her grasp; once touched by the Siguanaba the child is driven mad and she will lead her victim into the wilderness to leave the child lost and insane.

Defence
Traditional methods are said to ward off the Siguanaba. In the border regions between Guatemala and El Salvador, those who see the Siguanaba make the sign of the cross upon her or bite their machete, while simultaneously banishing both the evil spirit and the fear that grips the victim.

Etymology
The word siguanaba or sihuanaba has its origin in the indigenous languages of Mesoamerica. Various words have been suggested as its source. In parts of Mexico the Siguanaba is known as macihuatli, a Nahuatl word that can be broken down to two elements; cihuatl (meaning "woman") and matlatl (meaning "net"). This "net-woman" encompasses the figurative idea of a woman capturing men in her metaphorical net of attraction.

Likewise, cigua or cegua, names for the spirit in Honduras and Costa Rica, also have their origin in the Nahuatl word cihuatl, simply meaning "woman". Guatemalan historian and folklorist Adrián Recinos gave two possible origins for the word siguanaba. In one of the 20+ languages of Guatemala, he claimed ciguanaba meant "naked woman" but he failed to identify the exact language of origin. In another source he claimed that its origin is the Nahuatl ciuanauac or ciguanauac, meaning "concubine".

In Guatemala, the word siguanaba has been linked to siwan, a Kʼicheʼ Maya word meaning a cliff or deep ravine, and Guatemalan folk etymology gives this as the origin of the word, although scholars such as Recinos and Roberto Paz y Paz disagree.

Regional variations

In Guatemala the Sihuanaba is known as La Siguanaba; she is known as Cigua in Honduras, Ciguanaba in El Salvador and as Cegua in Costa Rica. Although the name varies from place to place, the appearance and actions of the Sihuanaba remain unchanged.

Spain
In other latitudes and cultures, not connected to each other, the theme also appears. For example, an original variant is found in Spain. The washerwomen, especially in the province of Asturias, constitute a kind of supernatural beings, "ghosts that almost always lead to death." They are fuzzy beings who wash clothes on the banks of rivers on moonless nights. The specter of the Wagtail is often described as an old woman with white hair and dressed in black. There are also versions in which it is said that she acquires the form of a beautiful woman before men, but when men approach her, she turns into a monster and then kills them.

El Salvador

The Salvadoran legend of La Siguanaba says that the woman, originally called Sihuehuet (beautiful woman), was a peasant girl that ascended to queen using her charms (and a witch's brew) to lure into marriage Tlaloc's son, Yeisun, who was a Nahuatl prince. After marriage, when her husband went to war, she had affairs with other men, and Cipitio was the child of this relationship. Sihuehuet was a bad mother, neglecting her son, leaving him alone to meet her lovers. To inherit the throne she concocted a plot to use another magic potion to poison Yeisun during a festival, and so claim the throne for her lover.

But the plan worked too well. Yeisun was transformed into a savage giant monster with two heads, who ravaged the attendants to the palace's feast. The guard struggled and defeated the creature, ending Yeisun's life. When Tlaloc found out about this, he sought the help of the almighty god, Teotl whom condemned and cursed Sihuehuet: She would be  called Sihuanaba ("hideous woman"); she would be beautiful at first sight, but she would turn into a horrible abomination after luring her victims to isolated gorges. She was forced to wander the countryside, appearing to men who travelled alone at night. She is supposed to be seen at night in the rivers of El Salvador, washing clothes and always looking for her son, Cipitio, who was also cursed by Teotl to remain a boy for eternity.

Guatemala
In Guatemala, the Siguanaba is said to be encountered washing her hair with a golden bowl and combing her hair with a golden comb. She is said to wander the streets of Guatemala City, luring away men who are in love. In Guatemala, the legend is more common in Guatemala City, Antigua Guatemala (the old colonial capital) and the eastern departments of the country. The most common variant in these areas is that where the spirit has the face of a horse. In Guatemala the Siguanaba is often said to appear to men who are unfaithful in order to punish them.

A Kaqchikel Maya version of the Siguanaba from San Juan Comalapa describes her as a woman with enormous glowing eyes and a hoof for a hand. She wears a glittering dress and has very long hair and haunts the local rubbish dump, frightening disobedient children and drunken husbands.

On the Guatemalan side of Lake Güija, in Jutiapa Department, the Siguanaba is able to take on many forms but the most common is that of a slim, beautiful woman with long hair who bathes herself on the banks of the Ostúa River, although she may also appear by other water sources or simply by lonely roadsides. To lustful men she appears just as a beautiful woman, while to lovestruck men she takes the form of the object of the man's affections. A tale from San Juan La Isla relates how a man went to meet his wife who was returning on horseback from El Salvador, and after accompanying her for a while his "wife" flung herself from her mount and revealed herself to be the Siguanaba. In this same region, the Siguanaba is said to appear on moonlit nights to horseriders on lonely roads, asking to ride pillion. After riding with her victim for a short while, she reveals her fingernails as fearsome claws and her face as that of a horse, causing the rider to die of terror. Those lucky few that manage to flee find themselves lost in the wilderness.

Mexico
In Mexico the legend of the Siguanaba is present in almost the entire country, mostly throughout Mesoamerica, where they call her Macihuatli, Matlazihua, X'tabay, X'tabal or, more popularly, "Horse-faced woman". Some even relate it to La Llorona.

There are multiple testimonies and stories about this horror. Their common trait is that they can only be seen at night on lonely roads or places, showing themselves as night owls, partiers, womanizers, and/or drunkards. She presents herself as a woman with an attractive body, always on her back or walking away, with her face completely covered by either her hair or a large veil. Invariably, the victim is fascinated and attracted to the beautiful woman, whom he decides to approach, plying her with compliments and flirtation.

She always ignores him and tries to hide her face even more, which always provokes the victim's insistence, at which point she turns to reveal that she has a horse's head and red eyes. Sometimes she utters phrases like "Do I still look beautiful to you?" or "I also like you a lot". The victim screams in terror and flees, swearing never to drink again. Although there are cases in which the victim is "touched" and dies shortly thereafter despite attempts by the family to "take him to clean" or "cure him of dread". As you can see, this appearance plays a sobering role that brings a consequence for a specific behavior, it is not like the famous weeping woman who causes terror to whoever has the misfortune to meet her or hear her famous scream, regardless of gender, age or any other characteristics. The Siguanaba, or the woman with the face of a horse, is an entity that is in charge of complying with it, or else, of the classic recommendations of the grandmother or the mother to the young men: "do not go out now and behave well."

It should be mentioned that sometimes her head varies, not only can it be that of a horse, but it can also be that of a dog, a pig, an old woman's face, a skull or a disfigured and bloody face. Likewise, the horse's head also varies, it can be that of a common horse, a horse skull, it can be putrefied, it can be a face with rotten meat or a horse face with skin.

In the state of Nayarit, there is a version similar to the Salvadoran version. According to the Nayarit version, it was a woman or a moon goddess who was the wife of the god Tlaloc, with whom she had a son, who treated her badly, abandoned her and was unfaithful to her husband, who, after discovering his bad actions, He cursed her calling her Sihuanaba, which means 'horrible woman'; being condemned to wander the countryside, appearing to men as a beautiful woman and by the time they got close she would reveal a hideous horse face. He has always been seen more frequently on roads, rivers, fields, and elsewhere. Its victims are mainly infidels, whom it attracts to drive them crazy or kill them.

In the state of Coahuila, within the city of Torreón, this terrible specter that frightens men would actually be a woman who received a curse or was the victim of witchcraft, black magic or a satanic ritual, so it would be an evil or a demonic entity seeking "revenge". In preference, they appear to lustful, womanizing or night owls. Another version tells that it was a beautiful young woman who received a curse, turning her into this being; condemned to be with her woman's body and horse's head. The young woman would be normal, but when they approached her, her face would become that of a horse and everyone would run away from fright, so she would never find true love and be alone forever.

In the state of Nuevo León, they say that he is seen on the roads at night in search of punishing machistas, gangsters, womanizers, lustful or any man who goes astray to kill him. It is also said to cause accidents.

In Mexico City, according to the Mexica, the Macihuatli was the deity of the moon called Metztli, who pains the betrayal of her husband Tláloc. Other versions indicate that she was a woman of lousy behavior, which is why she was cursed by her husband or her father-in-law to wander as a ghost hunting men. Today, in some versions, she is described as a woman with a skull similar to that of a horse and with legs of a horse, which is beautiful at first glance, but up close is a monstrous being. In colonial legends she frightened the night owl, the rapist or the woman who walked in bad steps taking them to ravines and then killing him. Inclusively, there is the story of a supposed encounter of Hernán Cortés with this creature.

In the state of Puebla, it is known as the Andalona, where it is described as a spectrum that has multiple forms; he is said to seduce men who roam the mountains in order to drive them mad or kill them. Some say he dresses in white, has chicken feet and floats in the air.

In the state of Guerrero, it is known as the Chaneca, where it is said to be the fruit of a relationship between a common woman and a chaneque. She was given the opportunity to get to know the outside world. Like her father, she was very much in love but the men rejected her. For that reason, she decides to take revenge on men by seducing them and then killing them.

In Oaxaca, where he is known as the Matlazihua or Bandolera, he is associated with a "Zapotec" deity of death, formerly known as Mictecacihuatl. According to the old belief, this was the one that reigned and was in charge of collecting the souls of the deceased to take them to the underworld and was the husband of Mictlantecuhtli, the lord of the dead. It is also believed to be the soul in pain of a woman who was cruel and murderous, and wanders in this world by way of punishment. This specter is said to punish people's wrongdoings, or sins, but it generally appears to men (who would be drunkards, womanizers, partygoers, or those who abandon their families). She appears to them as a beautiful woman -of mixed race-, who draws them towards a ravine and when they approach her she reveals her horse face (or human skull, according to other versions; although also most of the time she is never seen face), which causes the man to fall into the ravine - leading them to suicide - and into the thorns so that they can bleed to death, although there are times when the victim survives, waking up in the thorns, in pain and without remembering anything that happened. other versions that say that the Matlazihua bathes or combs in the rivers of Oaxaca and whoever invades their space or takes their comb suffers the consequences. In other versions, like the Guatemalan and Nicaraguan versions, it is stated that she is not a single being, but that there are several that even cooperate with each other to scare her victim, communicate with each other with whistles and leave the men stunned.

In the state of Durango it is better known as the Caballona, where it also appears to men with sinful behavior. Here it devours or warns them. In the state of Jalisco, she is generally described as a woman dressed entirely in black, and she also appears to lovers and drunkards.

In the state of Aguascalientes, especially in the city of Calvillo, it is believed that the horse-faced woman was a beautiful woman who was unfaithful to him with many suitors (or with her lover, according to other versions). But, one day, the husband discovered her doing one of her infidelities with her lover, who, in an incredible state of jealousy, killed her lover. In the meantime, he tied his hands with a rope and, holding her by the horse, he made a swift run. This caused the poor woman to be seriously injured and her face was disfigured, which looked like a horse. The injuries were so severe that he ended up dying. Since then, it is said that, at night, an attractive woman can be seen walking who seduces men with bad behavior (especially unfaithful men), as punishment; to later reveal that he has a horse's face. In the town square, there is a monument of the Horse Face Woman, of which many of the inhabitants do not know the legend and its origin.

In the southeast of the republic they call it the Xtabay or Xtabal, which is, according to Mayan legend, an evil spirit that lives in ceiba trees and seduces anyone who comes near some of these trees. This was a Mayan goddess, dominated as Íxtab, who was the goddess of the hanged, the latter rewarded suicides with heaven but, with the arrival of Christianity, she is now the punisher of those already mentioned and a demon woman who scares the men. A second version tells that it was a Mayan princess named Suluay, daughter of Governor Halach Huinic, who had fallen in love with a young warrior and they saw each other in a ceiba tree. And that it was sent by the granddaughter of a witch, who spell it killing her immediately. Then they left the body in the bush. Although there are other versions that say that warrior was an assistant to the witch to help her kill Suluay. Well, whatever the origin of the Xtabay, it is said that it is a woman who appears in the ceibo trees, combing her long black hair, waiting for a man to approach her and start seducing them, to later reveal her true identity: demonic-looking and face with horse features (disfigured face or a pale woman's face with yellow eyes and snake tongue, according to other versions). Sometimes he lets them go, which drives them crazy or, at other times, they die of fright. Sometimes, she is seen as a punisher for drunks, womanizers and infidels, whom she chooses because they are easier to deceive and catch.

An important version is the concan version (from the town of Concá) of Querétaro of the Siguanaba, where it is said that it appears in a lake, under a bridge, which is known as the "Puente del Sapo", there it is He says that the Siguanaba appears as a beautiful woman who bathes naked to attract men, and always turns her back. The men approaching start talking while trying to see his face, many despair after waiting for a while to see his face; reason why many pull it, showing that, that woman who was supposed to have a beautiful face, has a horse's head that smiles at them maliciously, for which many flee. And the demonic spirit stays to continue its "ritual of conquest". Many, at night, fear and avoid passing by so that the horrifying appearance comes out and fear that the legend is true.

Finally, there is the Chiapas version (from the state of Chiapas). In this last version, it is known as the Nöwayomo, Tisigua or Tishanila. In some regions or places it is considered as an evil spirit and in others as a benign spirit. It is said that she is the wife of the Sombrerón. It is said that it appears to men who are unfaithful, bathes in any lake and when they approach it she reveals a demonized horse face (or a disfigured face according to the best known versions) that kills them or lets them go. Many of the unfortunate ones who have seen it change forever. Many of their relatives notice that they no longer eat and see that, in a corner or anywhere, they are seen sitting or standing waiting for the Tisigua or Tishanila. In other regions of Chiapas, it is also said that the Siguanaba may appear on the roads asking motorcyclists to climb it and, after a while of walking, it transforms into a monster with the head of a horse. In other regions it is known like the Yegualcíhuatl who, like the Mayan and Oaxacan version, bewitches men with her beautiful body, she always leads them to a ravine and then begins to throw them off the cliff by causing them to fall down the ravine - leading them to suicide -. It is said that they see that the woman, instead of walking, is floating through the air, but they do not give so much importance to wanting to reach her. In addition, some also sign that she is accompanied by the Cadejo and together they are in charge of punishing by scaring men of bad life.

Honduras
In Honduras it is known as "La Sucia" or Cigua. The popular story of a beautiful young woman denied marriage at the altar because she was unbaptized. She then wandered out of mind, never removing her increasingly filthy wedding dress until she died of heartbreak after her suitor married another. The story follows that she appears in beautiful form to lure men roaming drunk by rivers and streams, so enraptured by her beauty they follow her until she changes into a filthy horror that drives men crazy.

Costa Rica
In Costa Rica, this spectrum is known by the name of Cegua, a spectrum (colloquially, fright) that is characterized because its face is that of a dead horse in a state of decomposition. In this country, La Cegua is a myth that is present more than anything else in rural areas, although its actions are eminently the same as in the rest of Mexico and Central America (especially in relation to its habit of bathing at night), La Cegua has the peculiarity that sometimes it also appears among herds of horses, mounted on one of these, which causes panic. Other popular versions say that the Cegua appears on the roads as a beautiful woman before the womanizers or drunkards, who are asked to take her to her horse (car or motorcycle, according to the most modern versions). She is described as a very pretty young woman, white (or brunette, depending on the version), with an oval face, large black eyes, long curly black hair and a beautiful mouth, with lips red as blood, with a divine voice that lulls like siren song, and body with pronounced curves, slender and tempting. She is dressed in full black or white, and on some occasions, in a vaporous pink dress, and in other versions, with a luxurious period dress.

Legend has it that no man can resist such a beautiful body and sweet plea, which makes them climb it. Once climbing the woman, after a while of calbalgar, it transforms into a monster with a head similar to that of a horse. La Cegua also appears to those womanizing men who walk late at night on the street, she appears to them and with her sweetness makes him believe that it is a new conquest but at one point shows his horse face. Another important version is that the Cegua can also appear in the form of a child who cries inconsolably on the side of the road or near a river, and when the rider picks him up and puts him on the horse to calm him, he transforms into the monster with horse face. Regarding the origin of the character in the Costa Rican territory, it is believed or believed that La Cegua was a young libertine who had been cursed by her mother when the girl had tried to hit her, as she was denied permission to go to a party. Still others also affirm that it is a demonic manifestation, like that of the Devil. 

In the province of Guanacaste, also in Costa Rica, La Cegua, in addition to appearing to men on the roads, could also appear at dances and festivals in the towns, where she flirts with every man who approaches her. The one who manages to conquer her, accompanies her to the clearing of the Guanacaste pampa, and under a leafy Guanacaste tree, surrender to her love affairs, until late at night, when the man finally tries to kiss her, the metamorphosis occurs.

Nicaragua 
In Nicaragua, it is also known as the Cegua (or also Ceguanaba or Ceguanagua). In this country, Cegua is also more present in rural areas and its actions are the same as in other countries; It is said that she is a witch who was betrayed by her partner and that she is looking for revenge against the womanizing men and night owls, for which she would make a pact with the devil in a cornfield, where she would make a ritual to vomit her soul and begin his transformation, first transforming his face into that of a skeletal mare. Following that, the rest of her body transforms: her legs become as long and robust as a horse's hind legs, her feet get bigger, and the same goes for her arms, giving her great physical strength and speed, which will ensure you do not let your victim escape. Thus, with this transformation, the Cegua would walk through the fields in search of womanizers and night owls to punish them. When the rider or night owl is not cautious, the Cegua would ambush him first, playing with him, then tormenting him but not killing him immediately. The specter seizes the man and bites his cheek to mark him as an adulterer, leaving him crazy and scared to death. Of those who were left alive, they remain in a state of idiocy. From there, the Nicaraguan popular saying derives: "It is played by Cegua." There are also stories that the Cegua is not just one, but several ceguas that can even cooperate to catch their victim. Other versions include Mesoamerican horror as a beautiful girl who, when the man approaches, turns into a horrendous old woman.

There is also another version of the legend, located in the department of León, which describes her as an ugly and old woman, long white hair, with her breasts up to her stomach and who laughs mockingly. When she has her victim, who are men and boys, trapped, she offers him one of her breasts; It terrifies her until it drives her crazy. And still today, it is said that the Cegua also appears in the trees of Guanascaste, where a womanizer or late-night waiter awaits under a beautiful veil. When the man approaches, she lifts her veil, showing a horrible skull face in a decomposed state.

Panama
In Panama, this entity is known as the Empollerada Woman. As in Costa Rica and Nicaragua, it is said to punish drunk and womanizing men who travel by transport. She is described as a woman of great beauty who is very brooding, and very well groomed; hence its name. Upon seeing her, she would convince the man to put her on his horse (or car, according to the most modern accounts). The man, then, when turning to look lasciviously at the young woman, finds that he has mounted his horse on a spectrum that, where he previously had the head of a woman, now presents himself with the face of a human skull (or, in the most versions, such as a hatched skeleton). Thus scaring the man who is upset with fear before that terrifying specter. The origin of the ghost tells that it was a woman who committed suicide because her boyfriend or lover was unfaithful to her and, therefore, her spirit wanders in search of revenge, punishing womanizers and drunkards as her partner was.

Other spellings are: Cihuanaba, Sihuanaba, Ciguanaba, Ciguapa.

See also

List of fictional horses
Kuchisake-onna
La Llorona
Madam Koi Koi
Neck (water spirit)
Patasola - similar figure in Colombia
Qandisa
Rusalka
Sayona - a Venezuelan phantom figure similar to La Sihuanaba
Tikbalang
Vengeful ghost

Notes

References

Further reading

Central American mythology
Mythological hybrids
Mythological characters
Salvadoran mythology
Guatemalan folklore
Honduran folklore
Costa Rican folklore
Horses in mythology
Female legendary creatures
Mythological human hybrids
Spanish-language Mesoamerican legendary creatures